John Held  may refer to:

 John Held (cyclist), American cyclist, bronze medal winner at the 1949 UCI Track Cycling World Championships
 John Held Jr. (1889–1958), American cartoonist and illustrator
 John Held Jr. (mailartist) (born 1947), American visual and performance artist and author